Belle Vue Gaol (also known as Manchester City Gaol, Manchester Borough Gaol or Gorton Gaol) was a Victorian prison in Gorton, Manchester, England. It operated between 1850 and 1888. It was notorious at the time for abysmal prisoner living conditions. It was demolished in 1892.

Purpose
When the building of the gaol, located near Hyde Road, commenced circa 1845 it was intended to have been a short-term prison housing male and female inmates who were serving sentences of no more than six months. However, there are prison records that show that there were a few prisoners, mainly military prisoners, usually deserters, who were imprisoned there for up to two years. There were also facilities for securing prisoners awaiting trial at the Assize Court (after July 1864) in Manchester and the Quarter Sessions located nearby. The gaol was considered to be inadequate and as a result many other prisoners were sent to the New Bailey Prison in Salford.

References

External links
 Belle Vue Gaol entry on PrisonHistory.org

Prisons in Greater Manchester
1850 establishments in England
Buildings and structures demolished in 1892
History of Manchester
Former buildings and structures in Manchester
Demolished buildings and structures in Manchester
Defunct prisons in England